Ingrid Jeanine van Lubek (born 12 May 1971 in Roosendaal en Nispen) is an athlete from the Netherlands.  She competes in triathlon.

Van Lubek competed at the first Olympic triathlon at the 2000 Summer Olympics.  She took thirty-third place with a total time of 2:09:29.00.

Achievements
2006
1st Offroad triathlon, Lanklaar (Belgium), 16 September

References
sports-reference

1971 births
Living people
Dutch female triathletes
Triathletes at the 2000 Summer Olympics
Olympic triathletes of the Netherlands
Sportspeople from Roosendaal
Duathletes